Rembau may refer to:
Rembau District, Malaysia
Rembau (town)
Rembau (federal constituency), represented in the Dewan Rakyat
Rembau (state constituency), formerly represented in the Negri Sembilan State Council; see